Hong Sun Huot was the Cambodian Minister of Health and Chairman of the National AIDS Authority, as well as a Senior Minister. He belongs to Funcinpec and was elected to represent Kandal Province in the National Assembly of Cambodia in 2003. Hong is a third generation Chinese-Cambodian, with ancestral roots hailing from Chaozhou. His Chinese Family is 杨 (Yang).

References

Cambodian people of Chinese descent
Cambodian physicians
Members of the National Assembly (Cambodia)
FUNCINPEC politicians
Government ministers of Cambodia
Living people
Year of birth missing (living people)